Two classes and a one-ship class of submarine are known as the M class

 Soviet M-class submarine, a class of 148 Soviet Navy submarines built between 1933 and 1947
 British M-class submarine, a class of 3 Royal Navy submarine monitors built in 1917 and 1918
 , a one-off United States submarine launched in 1915

See also
 M class (disambiguation)